The 2019–20 season was AZ Alkmaar's 53rd season in existence and the club's 22nd consecutive season in the top flight of Dutch football. It covered a period from 1 July 2019 to 30 June 2020. AZ Alkmaar competed in the Eredivisie, the KNVB Cup and the UEFA Europa League.

Players

Out on loan

Transfers

In

Out

Pre-season and friendlies

Competitions

Overview

Eredivisie

League table

Results summary

Results by round

Matches
The Eredivisie schedule was announced on 14 June 2019. The 2019–20 season was abandoned on 24 April 2020, due to the coronavirus pandemic in the Netherlands.

KNVB Cup

UEFA Europa League

Second qualifying round

Third qualifying round

Play-off round

Group stage

Knockout phase

Round of 32

Statistics

Appearances and goals

|-
! colspan=12 style=background:#dcdcdc; text-align:center| Goalkeepers

|-
! colspan=12 style=background:#dcdcdc; text-align:center| Defenders

|-
! colspan=12 style=background:#dcdcdc; text-align:center| Midfielders

|-
! colspan=12 style=background:#dcdcdc; text-align:center| Forwards

|-
! colspan=12 style=background:#dcdcdc; text-align:center| Players transferred out during the season

Notes

References

External links

AZ Alkmaar seasons
AZ Alkmaar
AZ Alkmaar